Air Force One is a 1997 American political action thriller film directed and co-produced by Wolfgang Petersen and starring Harrison Ford, Gary Oldman, Glenn Close, Wendy Crewson, Xander Berkeley, William H. Macy, Dean Stockwell, and Paul Guilfoyle. The film was written by Andrew W. Marlowe. It tells the story of a group of terrorists who hijack Air Force One and the President's attempt to rescue everyone on board by retaking his plane.

The film was a box office success and received mostly positive critical reviews. It became the fifth highest-grossing film of 1997, earning $315.2 million worldwide.

Plot
A joint operation between American and Russian Special Forces captures General Radek, the dictator of a rogue neo-Soviet regime in Kazakhstan that retained its nuclear weapons, threatening war. Three weeks after the mission, U.S. President James Marshall attends a diplomatic dinner in Moscow, Russia, during which he praises the operation and insists the U.S. will "no longer negotiate with terrorists". Marshall and his entourage, including his wife Grace and daughter Alice, and several of his cabinet and advisers, prepare to return home on Air Force One. In addition, members of the press have been invited aboard, including six Radek loyalists disguised as journalists, led by Egor Korshunov.

After takeoff, Secret Service agent Gibbs, a mole, enables Korshunov and his men to obtain weapons and storm the plane, killing many of the other security and military personnel before taking the rest hostage, including Grace and Alice. Marshall is raced to an escape pod in the cargo hold while pursued by Korshunov's men, but they are too late to stop the pod from ejecting. Korshunov breaches the cockpit and slays the crew, narrowly preventing the plane from making an emergency landing at Ramstein Air Force Base in Germany. A squadron of F-15s escort Air Force One as Korshunov has it piloted towards a Radek-loyal airbase in Kazakhstan.

Unknown to all, Marshall, a veteran of the Vietnam War and a Medal of Honor recipient, had hidden himself in the cargo hold instead of using the pod, and stealthily observes the loyalists. He covertly kills some of Korshunov's men and uses a satellite phone to communicate with Vice President Kathryn Bennett, letting his staff know he is still alive and aboard the plane. Korshunov, assuming that it is merely a Secret Service agent that is in the cargo hold, contacts Bennett and demands Radek's release, threatening to kill a hostage every half-hour. Marshall and military advisors devise a plan to trick Korshunov to take Air Force One to a lower altitude for a mid-air refueling, buying time for the hostages to parachute safely off the plane. As a KC-10 tanker docks with Air Force One, Marshall helps to capture another loyalist and escorts the hostages to the cargo hold, where the majority parachute to safety. Korshunov discovers the deception and forces Air Force One to break the connection with the tanker, causing the fuel to ignite and destroying the tanker; the consequent shockwave disrupts the escape process, and Korshunov is able to stop Marshall, Chief of Staff Lloyd Shepherd, Major Caldwell and Gibbs from escaping. Some of the hostages and the captured loyalist fall out of the plane without parachutes to their deaths.

With the president and his family under his control, Korshunov violently berates Marshall for killing his men, and forces him to contact Russian President Petrov and arrange for Radek's release. Bennett is urged by Defense Secretary Walter Dean to declare the president incapable under the 25th Amendment, thus overriding Radek's release, but she refuses. While Korushunov and his men celebrate the news of Radek's release, Marshall breaks his bonds and kills Korshunov and his remaining henchmen. Marshall then rescinds his order to release Radek, who is subsequently shot dead when he attempts to escape.

Marshall and Caldwell direct the plane back to friendly airspace, accompanied by the F-15s, only to be quickly tailed by a second batch of Radek loyalists in MiG-29s. Marshall is saved by one F-15 pilot who sacrifices himself to intercept a missile; the resultant explosion damages the plane's tail, and they start to lose altitude. A standby USAF Special Operations Command MC-130E with the callsign Liberty 24 is called to help, sending parajumpers on tether lines to rescue the survivors. Marshall insists that his family and the injured Shepherd be transferred first. When there is time for only one more transfer, Gibbs reveals himself as the traitor, killing Caldwell and the last parajumper. Marshall and Gibbs fight for control of the transfer line; Marshall grabs and detaches it at the last moment. As the MC-130E airmen reel Marshall to safety, the now-inoperable Air Force One crashes into the Caspian Sea, killing Gibbs. With Marshall and his family safe, Liberty 24 is given the callsign Air Force One as they fly back to safety.

Cast
 Harrison Ford as President James Marshall, the popular President of the United States and a family man, who loves his wife, Grace, and daughter, Alice. Marshall is also a decorated helicopter-rescue pilot, Vietnam veteran and Medal of Honor recipient who speaks reasonably fluent Russian. Feigning escape during Air Force One's hijacking, he attempts to retake his aircraft and rescue everyone.
 Gary Oldman as Egor Korshunov, a ruthless Radek loyalist and terrorist ringleader, who leads the hijacking of Air Force One. Korshunov believes that the collapse of the Soviet Union has ruined his country. The character is erroneously named Ivan Korshunov in the end credits.
 Glenn Close as Vice President Kathryn Bennett, the first female Vice President of the United States, who commands the situation in the White House Situation Room
 Wendy Crewson as First Lady Grace Marshall
 Liesel Matthews as Alice Marshall, the President's daughter
 Paul Guilfoyle as White House Chief of Staff Lloyd Shepherd
 William H. Macy as Major Norman Caldwell, USAF, military aide to the President
 Dean Stockwell as Defense Secretary Walter Dean
 Elya Baskin as Andrei Kolchak, Korshunov's best friend, trusted lieutenant and pilot
 Levan Uchaneishvili as Sergei Lenski, Korshunov's henchman and communications expert
 David Vadim as Igor Nevsky, Korshunov's henchman
 Andrew Divoff as Boris Bazylev, Korshunov's henchman
 Ilia Volok as Vladimir Krasin, Korshunov's henchman and close friend, whom he served with in the Soviet-Afghan War
 Xander Berkeley as Secret Service Special Agent Gibbs, the head of the Presidential Protective Division and the hijackers' mole. The hijackers never reveal that Gibbs is their inside man.
 Alan Woolf as Russian President Stolicha Petrov
 Tom Everett as National Security Advisor Jack Doherty. Korshunov executes Doherty, the first hostage to die.
 Jürgen Prochnow as General Ivan Radek, the military dictator of a rogue terrorist regime in Kazakhstan, which has taken possession of stolen former Soviet nuclear weapons, threatening to start a new Cold War. Radek's regime is responsible for the killing of 200,000 people. Captured by a joint Russian–American military team, Radek is imprisoned in Russia, awaiting trial for his crimes against humanity. The terrorists who take over Air Force One demand his release, threatening to kill a hostage every half-hour. The character is erroneously named Alexander Radek by the end credits.
 Donna Bullock as Deputy Press Secretary Melanie Mitchell. Korshunov executes Melanie, the second hostage to die.
 Michael Ray Miller as Colonel Axelrod, USAF, pilot of Air Force One
 Carl Weintraub as Lieutenant Colonel Ingraham, USAF, co-pilot of Air Force One
 Spencer Garrett as White House aide Thomas Lee
 Bill Smitrovich as General William Northwood, the Chairman of the Joint Chiefs of Staff
 Glenn Morshower as U.S. Secret Service Agent Walters
 David Gianopoulos as U.S. Secret Service Agent Johnson
 Dan Shor as Notre Dame aide
 Philip Baker Hall as Attorney General Andrew Ward
 Richard Doyle as Colonel Bob Jackson, USAF, Air Force One Backup Pilot
 Willard Pugh as White House Communications officer
 Diana Bellamy as White House switchboard operator Pananides
 Don McManus as Lt. Colonel Jack Carlton, F-15 "Halo Flight" Leader
 J.A. Preston as Major General Samuel Greely. Having been President Marshall's commanding officer during the Vietnam War, he is the first to anticipate that Marshall is battling the hijackers.
 Michael Monks as Assistant White House Press Secretary

Production
A large part of the crew took a tour of the real Air Force One before filming. They based some of the film's scenes on the touring experience when the terrorists disguised as journalists survey the plane's layout and begin to take their seats. The character of Deputy Press Secretary Melanie Mitchell was based largely on their real-life tour guide, and the crew felt uncomfortable having to film the character's execution by the terrorists. For the exterior scenes, the producers rented a Boeing 747-146 aircraft, N703CK from Kalitta Air and repainted it to replicate the Air Force One livery.

Air Force One is shown as being equipped with a one-person escape pod for emergency use by the President of the United States. It was also done this way in at least three other films, Escape from New York, Bermuda Tentacles and Big Game. The actual Air Force One does not have an escape pod.

Paul Attanasio was brought in as a script doctor to work on the film prior to shooting. Scenes explaining Agent Gibbs' motivation for being the mole were cut from the final script. According to director Wolfgang Petersen, Gibbs was a former CIA agent who lost a lot after the end of the Cold War and thus became angry with the American government and wanted revenge. He knew the terrorists from his CIA days and so they included him in their operation. The scene was considered too long to tell and so it was cut from the film. The director also felt that it was unnecessary to have in the film so it was removed as it was irrelevant to the plot. Petersen also said that in the original draft, Gibbs revealed himself as the mole early and joined the terrorists in hijacking the plane. The director felt it was more suspenseful to keep the audience guessing in the final cut and specifically pointed to the scene in which Marshall gives Gibbs a gun before escorting the hostages from the conference room to the parachutes in the cargo hold.

Gary Oldman did not stay in character between the scenes. The director later said he called the filming experience "Air Force Fun" because of how comic and genial Oldman would be off-screen. He also said that Oldman would suddenly return to the menacing film persona like a shot. Oldman used his acting fee for the film to help finance his directorial debut, Nil by Mouth.

Kevin Costner was offered the role of James Marshall but turned it down as he had other commitments, and the script was given to Harrison Ford who accepted it.

General Radek's palace, seen in the film's opening, was portrayed by two locations in Cleveland, Ohio: the exterior was Severance Hall, and the interior was the Cuyahoga County Courthouse. The Russian prison where Radek was incarcerated was the Ohio State Reformatory, previously seen in The Shawshank Redemption and also used for Godsmack's music video for Awake in 2000. Ramstein Air Base, Germany was portrayed by Rickenbacker Air National Guard Base, Ohio. The diplomatic dinner scene was shot at the Ebell of Los Angeles while a second unit captured scenes in Red Square in Moscow. Scenes featuring Sheremetyevo International Airport, the departure airport of Air Force One in the film, were shot at Los Angeles International Airport.

F-15C Eagle aircraft from the 33rd Operations Group, 33rd Fighter Wing at Eglin AFB, Florida were used in the film.

Reception

Critical response
On Rotten Tomatoes, Air Force One has a "Certified Fresh" 78% rating, based on 63 reviews, with an average score of 7.00/10. The site's critical consensus reads, "This late-period Harrison Ford actioner is full of palpable, if not entirely seamless, thrills." On Metacritic, the film has a weighted average score of 61 out of 100, based on 25 critics, indicating "generally favorable reviews". Audiences polled by CinemaScore gave the film an average grade of "A" on an A+ to F scale.

Peter Travers of Rolling Stone awarded the film 3.5/4 stars, describing it as "superior escapism", and concluding, "Air Force One doesn't insult the audience. It is crafted by a film-maker who takes pride in the thrills and sly fun he packs into every frame. Welcome to something rare in a summer of crass commercialism: a class act." Todd McCarthy of Variety described the film as "a preposterously pulpy but quite entertaining suspense meller [melodrama]" that is "spiked by some spectacularly staged and genuinely tense action sequences". He lauded the film's antagonist: "[Gary] Oldman, in his second malevolent lead of the summer, after The Fifth Element, registers strongly as a veteran of the Afghan campaign pushed to desperate lengths to newly ennoble his country."

In a mixed review, Roger Ebert of the Chicago Sun-Times gave the film 2.5 stars out of 4 and found it flawed and cliché-ridden yet "well-served by the quality of the performances ... Air Force One is a fairly competent recycling of familiar ingredients, given an additional interest because of Harrison Ford's personal appeal." Adam Mars-Jones of The Independent was more critical, calling it "so preposterous that it begins to seem like a science-fiction artifact ... the product of a parallel-universe 1990s which somehow by-passed the decades since the 1950s."

President Bill Clinton saw the film twice while in office and gave it good reviews. He noted that certain elements of the film's version of Air Force One, such as the escape pod and the rear parachute ramp, did not reflect features of the actual Air Force One (though since many Air Force One features are highly classified and "need-to-know", these features cannot be completely ruled out). In the audio commentary, Wolfgang Petersen mused that although the real plane did not have those features at the time of the filming, they would probably be added by future governments.

During his campaign for the Presidency of the United States in the 2016 presidential election, businessman and Republican presidential candidate Donald Trump said he admired Ford for his role in Air Force One because he "stood up for America". Ford responded by reasoning that "it was just a film" and doubted Trump's presidential bid would be successful.

A Wall Street Journal poll in 2016 named Harrison Ford's James Marshall as the greatest fictional president.

Box office
One of the most popular action films of the 1990s, Air Force One earned $37.1 million during its opening weekend and ranked number one at the box office, beating Men in Black. At the time, the film had the fourth-highest opening weekend of that year, behind the latter film, The Lost World: Jurassic Park and Batman & Robin. It scored the highest opening weekend for an R-rated film, surpassing Interview with the Vampire. The film would hold this record for three years until it was surpassed by Scary Movie in 2000. Additionally, the film achieved the highest opening weekend for a Harrison Ford film, surpassing the former record held by Indiana Jones and the Last Crusade. For a decade, it would go on to hold this record until 2008 when it was taken by Indiana Jones and the Kingdom of the Crystal Skull. Air Force One went on to make $172,650,002 (54.9%) domestically and $142,200,000 (45.1%) in other countries, bringing the total gross to $315.2 million.

Accolades

The film is recognized by American Film Institute in these lists:
 2001: AFI's 100 Years...100 Thrills – Nominated

Home media 
Air Force One was released on VHS, LaserDisc, and DVD on February 10, 1998, and on Blu-ray on June 2, 2009. A 4K UHD Blu-ray followed on November 6, 2018.

The US LaserDisc release of the film is notorious among LaserDisc collectors as being extremely prone to "Laser rot", a form of optical disc degradation, due to repeat production issues at the Sony DADC facility where the discs were produced.

Score

Randy Newman was initially hired to write the film score; however, Petersen considered his composition to be almost a parody and commissioned Jerry Goldsmith to write and record a more somber and patriotic score in just twelve days, with assistance from Joel McNeely. After the experience, Goldsmith vowed to never again take on such a last-minute task.

The music label Varèse Sarabande released a soundtrack album featuring Goldsmith's music. McNeely receives a credit on the back cover for "Additional Music in the Motion Picture", but none of his work is on the CD, although his cues include the material heard when Air Force One is under attack. On September 27, 2019, a 2-CD release featuring the full score was released.

The first track of the soundtrack, "The Parachutes", was used by Donald Trump during his campaign for president of the United States in 2016. The track was played in the background at the New York Hilton Midtown prior to Trump's victory speech, following Hillary Clinton's concession. The track was used repeatedly at campaign events with the Trump plane as background, leading the film's producer to ask him to stop using it.

Novelization
A novelization of the film was published in June 1997 by author Max Allan Collins. Although the book has the same central plot and outcomes as the film, its main storyline has additional scenes and lines not in the film. The book develops characters more than the film. Marshall is described as possessing a smile that is described in the novel as "the most valuable weapon in his public relations arsenal" (p. 11). He promotes an interventionist line on foreign policy and a strong stance against terrorism (met with political opposition from opposition Speaker of the House, Franklin Danforth, in the novel). He is described as a first-term President, up for re-election later on in the year that the film is set in. Marshall's home state is Iowa. A two-term former governor of Iowa in the novel, he first campaigns in the film for the US House.

He graduated from University of Iowa in the early 1970s in the novel and may also have attended the University of Notre Dame. His senior Staff and Cabinet include Vice President Kathryn Bennett (former congresswoman and trial attorney from New Jersey), Chief of Staff Lloyd Shepherd (an old friend from U of I), National Security Advisor Jack Doherty, Secretary of Defense Walter Dean, Deputy NSA Director Thomas Lee, Deputy Press Secretary Melanie Mitchell, Chairman of the Joint Chiefs Northwood, Air Force General Greeley (under whom Marshall served in Vietnam). His Party is Republican in the novel.

Marshall is described in the novel as "a moderate-Republican version of Bill Clinton, minus the womanizing reputation, and without a hint of personal or professional scandal" (p. 99–100). Korushunov's family is expanded upon, and it is revealed that Korushunov is not his real name. Unlike the movie, Gibbs's identity as the traitor is not revealed until the end of the book. It also hints at his motivation: "What he did remember, as he sipped his coffee, was that he knew these men, had worked with these men, and it was a damn shame they had to die so that he could be wealthy." Korushunov later tells Marshall he "paid" him off. It also presents a slightly alternative ending: in the novel, Air Force One crashes in the Russian countryside, but in the film, it crashes into the Caspian Sea.

References

Further reading

External links

 
 
 
 

1997 action thriller films
1997 films
American action thriller films
American aviation films
American disaster films
American political thriller films
Beacon Pictures films
Columbia Pictures films
1990s English-language films
Films scored by Jerry Goldsmith
Films about aviation accidents or incidents
Films about fictional presidents of the United States
Films about aircraft hijackings
Films about terrorism
Films directed by Wolfgang Petersen
Films set in the Caspian Sea
Films set in Germany
Films set in Kazakhstan
Films set in Moscow
Films set in the White House
Films set in Washington, D.C.
Films set on airplanes
Films shot in Cleveland
Films shot in Los Angeles
Films shot in Moscow
Films shot in Washington, D.C.
Films produced by Gail Katz
Touchstone Pictures films
Films about the United States Air Force
United States presidential succession in fiction
Films about Air Force One
1990s American films